Pawłowice  is a village in the administrative district of Gmina Krzemieniewo, within Leszno County, Greater Poland Voivodeship, in west-central Poland.

The village has a population of 2,000.

The village is the location of a classicist palace built for Maksymilian Mielżyński in 1779–1783.

External links
Hiking Across Leszno-Region
Pałac w Pawłowicach (in Polish with English summary page available)

References

Villages in Leszno County
Palaces in Poland